The Potez X was a French 1920s general-purpose colonial transport aircraft designed and built by Potez.

Development
The Potez X was a three-engined biplane with a fixed nosewheel landing gear supplemented with a tailskid. The first variant was the Potez X A which was powered by three 140 hp (104 kW) Hispano-Suiza 8Aa piston engines, two strut-mounted between the upper and lower wings and one nose-mounted. It had an enclosed cabin for 10 passengers with the pilot in an open cockpit behind the cabin. Later the engines were changed to more powerful Hispano-Suiza 8Ab versions. Two other variants were built with 280 hp (209 kW) Hispano-Suiza 8Bec engines, the X B was a military variant and the X C a commercial variant.

The Potez X formed the basis of two similar airliners in the Potez XVIII and Potez XXII.

Variants
XA
Original commercial variant with three  Hispano-Suiza 8Aa piston engines.
XB
Military variant with  Hispano-Suiza 8Fb engines.
XC
Civil variant with  Hispano-Suiza 8Bec engines.

Specifications (Potez X A)

References

Notes

Bibliography

1920s French airliners
R10
Trimotors
Biplanes